Grunitzky is a Slavic masculine surname, its feminine counterpart is Grunitzka or Grunitzkaya; it may refer to
Claude Grunitzky (born 1971), Togolese journalist, editor and entrepreneur, relative of Nicolas
Nicolas Grunitzky (1913–1969), Togolese politician of Polish descent

Polish-language surnames